Phomopsis prunorum is a plant pathogen infecting apples.

References

External links 
 USDA ARS Fungal Database

Fungal plant pathogens and diseases
Apple tree diseases
prunorum